Film Fans Award is an award given as part of Czech Lion Awards ceremony. It is given to the film that received highest number of votes from film fans.

Winners

External links

Awards for best film
Czech Lion Awards
Awards established in 2013